Matilda Kerry is a physician and TV presenter, currently a co-host on the Nigerian version of The Doctors. She first achieved national fame as the winner of the Most Beautiful Girl in Nigeria in 2000.

Education
Kerry attended Federal Girls College, Benin, where she obtained her WAEC certificate. Following her secondary education, she gained admission into the University of Lagos to study Medicine and Surgery. She also holds a master's degree in public health, is a member of the West African College of Public Health Physicians, and a Sexuality Leadership Development Fellow.

Pageants
In 2000, shortly after winning Miss Surulere, Kerry was crowned Most Beautiful Girl in Nigeria, making her Nigeria's Miss World and Miss Universe representative. In 2001, she crowned her successor Agbani Darego who went on to become Miss World later that year. She worked as a model between 2000 and 2006.

Career
Kerry graduated from the University of Lagos in 2006, and now practices medicine, specialising in community medicine. She is president of the George Kerry Life foundation, a foundation that gives awareness about non-communicable diseases (NCD's).

She is part of the Young African Leaders Initiative, a flagship program of President Barack Obama. In 2016, she was a Mandela Washington fellow, where she joined 1000 other young African leaders in Washington DC for the Presidential summit in 2016 to strategise on moving Africa forward.

References 

21st-century Nigerian medical doctors
Living people
Miss Universe 2000 contestants
Miss World 2000 delegates
Most Beautiful Girl in Nigeria winners
Nigerian public health doctors
Nigerian women medical doctors
University of Lagos alumni
Year of birth missing (living people)
21st-century women physicians
Women public health doctors
Most Beautiful Girl in Nigeria contestants